Bewafaa is a 2019 Pakistani romantic drama television series, produced by Fahad Mustafa and Dr. Ali Kazmi under the banner of Big Bang Entertainment, and directed by Aabis Raza. It has Naveen Waqar, Ali Rehman Khan and Ushna Shah in lead roles. It airs Monday evenings on ARY Digital. The serial is based on extra-marital affairs.

Cast 
 Naveen Waqar as Kinza
 Ali Rehman Khan as Ahaan
 Ushna Shah as Shireen
 Maira Khan as Sharmeen
 Sajida Syed
 Laila Zuberi as Ahaan's mother
 Daniyal Khan as Zeeshan

References 

Pakistani drama television series
2019 Pakistani television series debuts
ARY Digital original programming
Urdu-language television shows